The International Exhibition of Arts and Manufactures was a world's fair held in Dublin in 1865 attended by almost 1 million visitors.

Site and buildings

Main site
In 1862 the Duke of Leinster, Lord Talbot de Malahide and Benjamin Guinness created a Dublin Exhibition Palace and Winter Garden company to establish a Dublin exposition, the first in Dublin since the Great Industrial Exhibition (1853). Guinness supplied the Coburg Gardens, a 15-acre site to the company, which lay between Hatch Street, Harcourt Street and Earlsfort Terrace; and they additionally leased 2 more acres for exhibition grounds.

In 1862 the company called for designs at a cost of £35,000 or less. None of the submitted plans came within this cost constraint, but plans from Alfred G Jones were accepted with the proviso that they were revised. In the final design there were three buildings: a brick and stone building, a stone building with iron roof and an iron and glass building, the latter influenced by The Crystal Palace.

The foundations were started in 1863.

Auxiliary site
In addition to the main site and gardens; vegetable, seeds, and farm implements were displayed at the Royal Dublin Society buildings (now Archaeology and Natural History Museum buildings) in Kildare Street.

The fair

The iron and glass building was stress tested by 600 soldiers marching along the galleries on 31 March 1865 and the exhibition opened by the then Prince of Wales on either 9 May  or 8 May, 1865.

The fair attracted 956,000 visitors  with averages of 5,000 day visitors, and 3,000 evening visitors

Displays of fine arts, textiles, manufactured goods and raw materials occupied 4,781 display cases  (2,413 British Isles, 2,368 foreign countries, cities and colonies).

Aftermath

After 1911, the building that lay along Earlsfort Terrace and the winter gardens became part of one of the city's university and later the building became the National Concert Hall with the winter gardens forming the Iveagh Gardens. A rustic grotto and some statues remain in Iveagh Gardens.

References

External links

 Engraving showing the main building
 Print of the interior of the Dublin Exhibition Palace and Winter Garden

Further reading
 

1860s architecture
1865 establishments in Ireland
1865 disestablishments in Ireland
1865 in art
1865 in Ireland
World's fairs in Dublin (city)